The 1952 United States presidential election in Montana took place on November 4, 1952 as part of the 1952 United States presidential election. Voters chose four representatives, or electors to the Electoral College, who voted for president and vice president.

Montana voted overwhelmingly for the Republican nominee, war hero General Dwight D. Eisenhower, over the Democratic nominee, Illinois Governor Adlai Stevenson. Eisenhower won Montana by a landslide margin of 19.32%, carrying all counties except four in the mining areas and on the northern border.

Results

Results by county

See also
 United States presidential elections in Montana

References

Montana
1952
1952 Montana elections